Tanaji Malusare was a warrior and commander of Chhatrapati Shivaji Maharaj. A local poet Tulsidas, wrote a powada describing Tanaji's heroics and sacrifice of life in the Battle of Sinhagad, which has since made him a popular figure in Indian folklore.

Biography 
Tanaji came from a Hindu Koli family. Tanaji's father's name was Kaloji Malusare. His family was from Godoli village, which is situated near Pachgani. He spent his childhood there. When Chhatrapati Shivaji  Maharaj appointed him to curb robbers of Poladpur, Mahabaleshwar, he then migrated to Umrath village. Tanaji had a son, Rayba Malusare and a brother Suryaji Malusare. His uncle Shelar Mama was also in the service of Shivaji. He postponed his son Rayba's wedding to win the Kondana fort from Mughals. Legends say that he took the  responsibility to win that fort and said, "Aadhi Lagan Kondhanyache aani mag majhya Raybache"(a) (').

Military career 
Malusare was with Shivaji Bhosale around the time when he took his pledge at Rayareshwar's temple to establish a sovereign kingdom. He was part of Maratha troops in the battle of Paratpgad, where Chatrapati Shivaji Maharaj killed Afzal Khan.

Battle of Sinhagad

Chatrapati Shivaji Maharaj attacked Shahista Khan in Pune. He plundered and looted wealthy port city, Surat of Mughal empire. In 1665 Aurangzeb sent Jai Singh and Diler Khan to defeat Shivaji and Adilshahi in Deccan. Jai Singh sieged Purandar fort, attacked by cannons. Murarbaji was the Kiledar of Purandar. Jai Singh had a large army which he used to plunder number of villages of the Maratha Kingdom. Murar Baji Prabhu with his Mavales killed five hundred Pathan besides many Bahlia infantrymen, he tried to break siege but could not do that, he lost his life while defending the fort. To avoid further loss of human life, Chatrapati Shivaji Maharaj  had truce talks with Jai Singh. Shivaji Maharaj and Jai Singh did the treaty of Purandar, by this treaty Shivaji Maharaj agreed to give his 23 forts including Kondhana to Mughals and joined them for attack on Adilshahi dynasty.  As per one of the condition in the treaty, Chatrapati Shivaji Maharaj gone to Agra. There Aurangzeb house arrested him but Chatrapati Shivaji Maharaj managed to escape. He returned home and when Jai Singh died at Burhanpur and Aurangzeb got busy in North. He began recapture his forts from Mughals.

Kondhana, outside Pune, was one of the first forts that Shivaji wanted to re-capture from the Mughal Empire, after the truce between the two parties broke down in 1670. Tanaji was asked to lead the task. Legend says that Tanaji agreed to lead even though that meant postponing his son's wedding.

Tanaji Malusare with his picked 300 Mavle infantry scaled less abrupt side near Kalyan gate by rope ladders and slain the sentinels. The garrison fought desperately but Mavales (Soldiers from Maval region) carried havoc in their ranks. Amid the fighting Tanaji's shield broke, he tied cloth of his turban to his hand and defensed the strikes by it. The two chiefs challenged each other and both fell down. Tanaji was accompanied by his brother Suryaji Malusare, and maternal uncle Shelar Mama in the campaign. Marathas butchered enemies, slain more than one thousand Rajputs and many more perished in attempt run from the garrison and scaled down the Mountain. The campaign to recapture the fort ended with victory for the Marathas, but at the cost of Tanaji losing his life in the battle.

The fort was renamed Sinhagad (English: Lion fort) by Chatrapati Shivaji Maharaj in honor of Tanaji.

Legacy 

 Balbharati's fourth class's history textbook has a chapter about Tanaji Malusare and Battle of Kondhana.

In popular culture

 Hindutva Ideologue Vinayak Damodar Savarkar had written a ballad on him, which was banned by the colonial British government.
 Gad aala pan sinh gela (Marathi: गड आला पण सिंह गेला) a Marathi novel by Hari Narayan Apte was written in 1903, based on his life. 
 Sinhagad, a 1933 Marathi film was produced by Baburao Painter, based on the 1903 novel. 
 Bengali writer Saradindu Bandyopadhyay wrote the Sadashib series where the younger version of Tanaji was mentioned as a close associate of Shivaji.
 In 1971 Amar Chitra Katha released a comic book called Tanaji, written by Meena Talim and illustrated by Vasant B. Halbe. 
 Tanaji's character is portrayed by an actor in Raja Shivchatrapati serial of Star Pravah.
 In the 2018 Marathi-language epic Farzand, Tanaji Malusare is portrayed by Ganesh Yadav.
 In the 2019 Marathi-language epic Fatteshikast, Tanaji Malusare is portrayed by Ajay Purkar.
 Bollywood actor Ajay Devgn produced and played the role of Tanaji Malusare in Tanhaji film. It was based on the Battle of Kondhana, Tanaji film theatrically released on 10 January 2020. It was a box-office hit.

See also

 Leonidas I 
 Baji Prabhu Deshpande
 Murarbaji
 Khemirao Sarnaik 
 Maharana Pratap 
 Bahirji Naik 
 Rana Sanga

Notes

References

Koli people
1670 deaths
People of the Maratha Empire
Indian warriors
Marathi people
Year of birth unknown
Maharashtra
17th-century Indian people